Clinus cottoides, the bluntnose klipfish, is a species of clinid that occurs in subtropical waters of the Atlantic Ocean around South Africa where it is a denizen of tide pools.  This species can reach a maximum length of  TL.  This species has a varied diet of benthic organisms including algae, crustaceans (isopods, amphipods, ostracods, copepods), mollusks (gastropods, chitons) and polychaete worms. Comparing reproductive rates between males and females of the species, males tend to have a higher rate engaging in sexual activity. This results in a polygynandrous mating system.

References

cottoides
Fish described in 1836